Valentina Castro (born 17 July 1981) is a Chilean former professional tennis player.

Castro was a regular member of the Chile Fed Cup team from 1998 to 2006, appearing in a total of 33 ties. She won 18 singles and nine doubles rubbers for Chile. On the professional tour she reached a best singles ranking of 436 in the world and won her only ITF title in doubles, at Toluca in 2005.

Her elder sister, Bárbara, was also a professional tennis player.

ITF finals

Doubles: 3 (1–2)

References

External links
 
 
 

1981 births
Living people
Chilean female tennis players
21st-century Chilean women